National Route 148 is a national highway of Japan connecting Ōmachi, Nagano and Itoigawa, Niigata in Japan, with a total length of 69.9 km (43.43 mi).

References

148
Roads in Nagano Prefecture
Roads in Niigata Prefecture